St David's Hotel may refer to:
 St David's Hotel, Harlech
 Voco St David's Cardiff Hotel